Alika Joseph Kaleiali'i DeRego (born September 7, 1986) is an American men's volleyball player who won the 2011 USA Volleyball Open National Championship gold medal with Creole Volleyball Club from the Garden Empire Volleyball Association Region (GEVA). As a libero, he has played for Creole Volleyball Club from Brooklyn, New York in the 2011 and 2012 US Open of Volleyball National Championships, helping Creole to the Gold Medal in the Men's Open Division at the 2011 USA Volleyball Open Championships in Dallas, TX, earning all-tournament team honors.

Career

High school
DeRego played volleyball for four years at James B. Castle High School in Kaneohe, Hawaii as an Outside Hitter and Setter. He was a Honolulu Star-Bulletin All-State selection and led his team to the Oahu Interscholastic Association (OIA) Eastern Division Championship in 2002. He was the 2002 OIA Player of the Year and a First-team All-OIA selection.

College
DeRego helped guide the Pirates to a Pacific Coast Athletic Conference Championship and spot in the Final Four at the California Community College Athletic Association State Championship Tournament. He was selected to the Pacific Coast All-Conference team and was honored as an Orange Coast College Scholar-Athlete. DeRego led and ranked first with 212 digs and a 3.31 digs per set average (64 games, 212 digs). He finished placing second all-time at Orange Coast College (OCC) in career digs and fourth and ninth all-time in single-season digs. He was also selected OCC Freshman of the Year. DeRego later transferred to California State University, Long Beach.

He graduated from Orange Coast College with an AA in Liberal Arts. DeRego then graduated from California State University, Long Beach with a BA in Psychology.

Club
DeRego played for Creole Volleyball Club from Brooklyn, New York from the Garden Empire Volleyball Association Region (GEVA) during the 2011 and 2012 seasons.  DeRego helped Creole VBC to the 2011 82nd Annual USA Volleyball Open National Championship Gold Medal, Men's Open (Gold Division) in Dallas, Texas.  In 2012 he again helped Creole VBC to a 7th-place finish in the US Open Championships, winning the Men's Open (Silver Division) in Salt Lake City, Utah. DeRego also played for Rukkus Volleyball Club from the Southern California Region. Team won the 2019 USA Volleyball Open National Championship Silver Medal, in Columbus, Ohio.

In 2015, DeRego played for Kailua Volleyball Club from Kailua, Hawaii from the Aloha Volleyball Region (AH), helping the team capture the 
2015 58th Annual Haili Volleyball Tournament, Men's Open Championship, in Hilo, Hawaii, earning all-tournament team honors. In 2016 he again helped Kailua VBC to a 2nd-place finish in the Haili Volleyball Tournament, Men's Open Championship.

Personal
DeRego was born in Honolulu, Hawaii. He graduated from California State University, Long Beach with a bachelor's degree (BA) in Psychology. He then earned his master’s degree (MA), in Coaching and Athletic Administration, from Concordia University, Irvine

References

American men's volleyball players
1986 births
Living people
Sportspeople from Hawaii
Orange Coast College alumni
California State University, Long Beach alumni